Gobioides is a genus of gobies native to marine, fresh and brackish waters along the coasts of the Atlantic Ocean and in fresh waters of the Pacific coast of the Americas.

Species
There are currently five recognized species in this genus:
 Gobioides africanus (Giltay, 1935)
 Gobioides broussonnetii Lacépède, 1800 (Violet goby)
 Gobioides grahamae G. Palmer & Wheeler, 1955
 Gobioides peruanus (Steindachner, 1880) (Peruvian eelgoby)
 Gobioides sagitta (Günther, 1862)

References

Gobionellinae